Roncador Cay is a small island of the Roncador Bank, located in the west Caribbean Sea, off the coast of Central America,  east-northeast of Providencia Island.

History 
The USS Kearsarge ran aground on a reef off the cay on February 2, 1894, and, being deemed unsalvageable, was declared lost by the United States Navy.

Colombia and the United States have claimed the cay but the United States abandoned its claim in a 1972 treaty.

References

CIA World Factbook on Colombia
 1972 Treaty
 Luis Angel Arango Library; Tratado con Estados Unidos (Treaty with the United States)

Caribbean islands of Colombia
Islands of the West Caribbean
Islands of the Archipelago of San Andrés, Providencia and Santa Catalina
Atolls of Colombia
Caribbean islands claimed under the Guano Islands Act
Former disputed islands